The 1958 Holy Cross Crusaders football team was an American football team that represented the College of the Holy Cross as an independent during the 1958 NCAA University Division football season.  In its 15th year under head coach Eddie Anderson, the team compiled a 6–3 record. The team played its home games at Fitton Field in Worcester, Massachusetts.

The team's statistical leaders included Tom Greene with 976 passing yards, Joe Stagnone with 223 rushing yards and 18 points scored, and Dave Stecchi with 331 receiving yards.

Schedule

References

Holy Cross
Holy Cross Crusaders football seasons
Holy Cross Football